Acacia halliana is a shrub belonging to the genus Acacia and the subgenus Phyllodineae that is native to parts of south eastern Australia.

Description
New shoots are often densely covered in pale yellow hairs. Like most species of Acacia it has phyllodes instead of true leaves. The evergreen phyllodes are inequilateral and have a narrowly oblong or narrowly elliptic shape and can be straight or a little recurved.

Taxonomy
The specific epithet honours Norman Hall who once worked for the CSIRO.

Distribution
The shrub has a distribution as far west as the Eyre Peninsula in South Australia up to around Euston in New South Wales in the north and Gunbower in the east where it is growing in sandy or calcareous loamy soils as a part of mallee woodland or scrubland communities.

See also
 List of Acacia species

References

halliana
Flora of New South Wales
Flora of South Australia
Flora of Victoria (Australia)
Plants described in 1987
Taxa named by Bruce Maslin